"Bibia Be Ye Ye" is a song by English singer-songwriter Ed Sheeran. It was included on the deluxe edition of his third studio album ÷ (2017) and is the fourteenth track. It was written by Benny Blanco, Ed Sheeran, Fuse ODG, KillBeatz and Stephen Woode with Sheeran, Blanco and KillBeatz handling the production. After the album's release it charted at number 18 on the UK Singles Chart, despite not being an official single.

Critical reception
Celeb Mix writer Ellie Doe-Demosse stated: "Bibia Be Ye Ye is 100% one of the greatest songs on this album. For those of you who are intrigued by the title and its meaning, Bibia Be Ye Ye means “all will be well” in one of Ghana’s many native languages, Twi. Yes, Ed wrote this song while he was staying in Ghana on his hiatus and again, we love how he incorporated African/Ghanaian culture in his album. It displays diversity among different cultures, and that’s a special and unique thing to see, which is something we love a lot."

Music video
A music video for this song was uploaded to YouTube on August 3, 2017. It features Sheeran having a trip to Ghana.

Charts and certifications

Weekly charts

Certifications

References

Songs written by Benny Blanco
2017 songs
Ed Sheeran songs
Songs written by Ed Sheeran